Khopoli railway station (formerly Campoolie railway station, station code: KP) is a suburban railway station on the Central line of the Mumbai Suburban Railway in Mumbai, India. Khopoli is the terminus of the Central Railway's south-eastern corridor. Unlike Kasara, there are no tracks connecting to major cities, like Kasara connects to Nashik. Instead, the Central railway diverges from Karjat, moves onto Palasdhari railway station and continues further towards Lonavla, Pune, Chennai and Kanniyakumari stations. 

Daily, there are seventeen inbound and outbound services each to/from Khopoli, with nine inbound and seven outbound to CSMT, whereas eight inbound and ten outbound towards Karjat.

Initially, Khopoli railway station only had one platform employing both up and down locals. In 2019, one more platform has been incorporated facilitating up and down movement of central local trains.

Gallery

References

Railway stations in Raigad district
Mumbai Suburban Railway stations
Mumbai CR railway division
Karjat-Khopoli rail line